The Country Club of Virginia (CCV) is a private country club located in Richmond, Virginia. Spanning 1,111 acres, it contains three eighteen-hole golf courses, two clubhouses, and numerous other sport and recreational facilities. The club was founded in 1908, and its first clubhouse and Herbert Barker-designed golf course were completed in Richmond's Westhampton neighborhood in 1910. Its James River Course, designed by William Flynn, opened in 1928; it has hosted many prominent events, including the 1955 and 1975 United States Amateur Championships and, since 2016, the annual Dominion Energy Charity Classic. A third course, the Tuckahoe Creek Course, opened in 1988.

History

Formation and early years
While golf is known to have been introduced to the Americas as early as the 1650s, it wasn't until the last two decades of the nineteenth century that the sport saw a boom in popularity in the region. Around the same time, the first country clubs in the United States were formed by groups of upper-class elites seeking community and recreation amid growing suburbanization. By 1903, a number of such clubs, devoted to golf and other activities, emerged in the vicinity of Richmond, Virginia. Among them were the Deep Run Hunt Club, Lakeside Country Club, and Hermitage Golf Club, none of whom owned their own facilities at the time. Inspired by the success of large clubs in cities like St. Louis and Baltimore, a group of citizens proposed consolidating the existing organizations into one entity and purchasing land on which to build a clubhouse and other amenities.

Despite the initial support of the presidents of Deep Run, Lakeside, and Hermitage, by 1905, it was reported that the new club would be organized independently. Plans were made to buy "Westbrook," in North Side, the former country estate of Lewis Ginter, but a sale price could not be agreed upon, and an alternate site in the West End was selected. The new property, in an area then known as Rio Vista, abutted Westhampton Park, a trolley park at the end of one of the city's streetcar lines, and was noted for its view of the James River. Articles of incorporation were originally submitted to the State Corporation Commission under the name "Old Dominion Country Club," but the application was amended when it was discovered that similarly-named entities already existed. The group, having decided to call themselves "The Country Club of Virginia," received their charter on July 23, 1908.

Mid 20th century to present

Facilities

Westhampton campus

James River campus

Membership
Notable members of the club have included Lewis F. Powell Jr., who left in 1979 following criticism of its failure to admit non-white members, Eppa Hunton Jr. and his son, Eppa Hunton IV, Kate Langley Bosher, Charles Gillette, who designed a number of the club's landscaping features, Richard S. Reynolds Sr. and his grandson, J. Sargeant Reynolds, E. Claiborne Robins, Collins Denny Jr., Harry Easterly, Robert H. Patterson Jr., William J. Armfield IV, and Richard Cullen.

See also
 History of Richmond, Virginia

References

External links
 

1908 establishments in Virginia
Athletics clubs in the United States
Golf clubs and courses in Virginia
Organizations based in Richmond, Virginia
Sports venues completed in 1910
Sports venues in Richmond, Virginia